The Yurubchenko-Tokhomskoye gas field is a natural gas field located in the Krasnoyarsk Krai. It was discovered in 1972 and developed by and Rosneft. It began production in 2012 and produces natural gas and condensates. The total proven reserves of the Yurubchenko-Tokhomskoye gas field are around 11.9 trillion cubic feet (340×109m³), and production is slated to be around 1 billion cubic feet/day (30×105m³) in 2010.

References

Natural gas fields in Russia
Natural gas fields in the Soviet Union